Marin Petkov Yonchev (Bulgarian: Марин Петков Йончев) (born January 28, 1988 in Plovdiv, Bulgaria) is the winner of the first Star Academy reality show in Bulgaria in 2005.

Early years
Born in 1988 Marin Petkov Yonchev was introduced to the art of music at a very early age. A holder of multiple prizes in singing competitions, his first step on stage was at the age of 4.  Among others, major factor in steering his future career aspirations has been his decade-long musical growth in the Plovdiv boys choir “Stefka Blagoeva”.
Marin has been in the spotlight since 2000, when he won the “Hit – 1” competition, together with his sister Sonya Yoncheva. He also won the prize of Aliance Francaise for Young Singer in 2004, in Plovdiv.  A major leap to fame came with winning the first Bulgarian reality music TV show “Star Academy” in 2005.  In the year that followed, he was awarded 1st prize for a debut in BG Radio for his song and video – “One senseless Day”. Eighteen years of age at that point, Marin would spend the next five years searching for his true calling in arts. He would eventually find it in the opera, and step on a stage again in 2011.

Opera

In July 2011, Marin sang in a concert with Sonya Yoncheva in the Antique Theatre in Plovdiv, Bulgaria. The following month, he took part in a concert in Vienna with Lilia Ilieva and Kaludi Kaludov. Then came November 2012, when he partnered with his sister and the Sofia Philharmonic Orchestra in a concert in Bulgaria Hall, Sofia. 

In September 2013, he was invited to participate in a concert in the castle of the Belgian Prince of Chimay, organized as part of the celebration for his wedding.  Two months later, he sang in a gala evening in Lille, France.

A year later, in September 2014, Marin participated in a concert of Raina Kabaivanska, dedicated to “A Hundred Years of the Birth of Boris Hristov”, and held in the Antique Theatre, Plovdiv.

In 2016 he participated in a gala concert, part of the program of the Festival in Miskolz in Hungary. A month later he took part in the production of Iris from Mascagni in the festival Radio France in Montpellier. December the same year, he sang the tenor part of the 9th Symphony of Beethoven in the Opera of Salvador in Salvador de Bahia, Brazil, where he also held teaching classes for the children in the local school of music.

Marin was given the role of  Parpignol in “La Boheme” by Puccini in the Lausanne Opera in early 2017, and the role of Itulbo in Bellini`s Il Pirata in Bordeaux, France. He would perform as the latter again in the end of 2019, when Il Pirata will be presented in Theatro Real in Madrid.

Other performances of Marin include numerous guest appearances in recitals in Germany, Russia, France, Switzerland, Belgium and Bulgaria.

Songs from SA
Marin Yonchev - I Don't Want To Miss A Thing
Marin Yonchev - Senza Una Donna
Marin Yonchev - Unchained Melody
Marin Yonchev - Always On My Mind
Marin Yonchev - Pretty Woman
Marin Yonchev - Every Breath You Take
Marin Yonchev - My Way
Marin Yonchev - Always
Marin Yonchev - Ako ne tragna, shte ostana
Marin Yonchev - Otkakto ti
Marin Yonchev - Umoreni Krila
Marin Yonchev - Pustinna Zemq
Marin, Daniel, Georgi - All For Love

References

https://marinyonchev.com

External links
https://marinyonchev.com

1988 births
Living people
21st-century Bulgarian male singers
Bulgarian pop singers
Musicians from Plovdiv
Star Academy (Bulgarian TV series)
Star Academy winners